Henry Stormont Finch-Hatton, 13th Earl of Winchilsea and 8th Earl of Nottingham (3 November 1852 – 14 August 1927) was an English peer.

Early life
He was the third son of George Finch-Hatton, 10th Earl of Winchilsea (1791–1858) and his third wife Frances Margaretta Rice (1820–1909). His maternal grandparents were Edward Royd Rice, British MP for Dover from 1847 to 1857, and the former Elizabeth Knight daughter of Edward Austen Knight, brother of Jane Austen

He was educated at Eton and matriculated at Balliol College, Oxford in 1874, although he remained at the university for only one year.

Career
From 1875 until 1887, he was a cattle-farmer and gold miner in Queensland, Australia. His brother Harold Finch-Hatton joined him in Queensland, settling in the Mackay area from 1875 to 1883 and wrote an account of his experiences, entitled "Advance Australia".

In 1898, his older brother, Murray Finch-Hatton, 12th Earl of Winchilsea died and was survived by his daughter, therefore, Henry Stormont Finch-Hatton succeeded him, becoming both the Earl of Winchilsea and Nottingham.

Personal life
On 12 January 1882 at St Peter's Church, Eaton Square, he married Anne Jane Codrington (died 20 June 1924), daughter of Admiral Sir Henry Codrington and Helen Jane Smith. They had three children:

 Lady Gladys Margaret Finch-Hatton (1882–1964), who married Capt. Osmond Trahairn Deudraeth Williams (1883–1915), second son of Sir Osmond Williams, 1st Baronet.
 Guy Montagu George Finch-Hatton, 14th Earl of Winchilsea (1885–1939), who married American heiress Margaretta Armstrong Drexel and succeeded his father.
 Denys Finch Hatton (1887–1931), who died unmarried in East Africa, killed in a flying accident.

He died in London on 14 August 1927 at the age of 74 and was buried at Ewerby, Lincolnshire.

References 

1852 births
1927 deaths
13
708
19th-century British people
20th-century British people
Henry
People educated at Eton College
Alumni of Balliol College, Oxford